Premio Nadal is a Spanish literary prize awarded annually by the publishing house Ediciones Destino, part of Planeta. It has been awarded every year on 6 January since 1944. The Josep Pla Award for Catalan literature is given at the same ceremony.

The current monetary award stand at €18,000 for the winner and  since 2010 there has been no runner-up. It is one of the oldest and most prestigious Spanish literary awards.

Winners
List of Premio Nadal winners since the award was established:

 1944: Carmen Laforet for Nada
 1945: José Félix Tapia for La Luna ha entrado en casa
 1946: José María Gironella for Un hombre
 1947: Miguel Delibes for La sombra del ciprés es alargada
 1948: Sebastián Juan Arbó for Sobre las piedras grises
 1949: José Suárez Carreño for Las últimas horas
 1950: Elena Quiroga for Viento del Norte
 1951: Luis Romero for La noria
 1952: Dolores Medio for Nosotros, los Rivero
 1953: Lluïsa Forrellad for Siempre en capilla
 1954: Francisco José Alcántara for La muerte le sienta bien a Villalobos
 1955: Rafael Sánchez Ferlosio  for El Jarama
 1956: José Luis Martín Descalzo for La frontera de Dios
 1957: Carmen Martín Gaite for Entre visillos
 1958: José Vidal Cadellans for No era de los nuestros
 1959: Ana María Matute for Primera memoria
 1960: Ramiro Pinilla for Ciegas hormigas
 1961:  for El curso
 1962:  for Muerte por fusilamiento
 1963: Manuel Mejía Vallejo for El día señalado
 1964:  for El miedo y la esperanza
 1965: Eduardo Caballero Calderón for El buen salvaje
 1966:  for La zancada
 1967: José María Sanjuán for Réquiem por todos nosotros
 1968: Álvaro Cunqueiro for Un hombre que se parecía a Orestes
 1969:  for Las hermanas coloradas
 1970:  for Libro de las memorias de las cosas
 1971:  for El cuajarón
 1972:  for Groovy
 1973:  for El rito
 1974: Luis Gasulla for Culminación de Montoya
 1975: Francisco Umbral for Las ninfas
 1976: Raúl Guerra Garrido for Lectura insólita de "El Capital"
 1977:  for Conversación sobre la guerra
 1978:  for Narciso
 1979: Carlos Rojas for El ingenioso hidalgo y poeta Federico García Lorca asciende a los infiernos
 1980:  for Concerto grosso
 1981:  for Cantiga de agüero
 1982: Fernando Arrabal for La torre herida por el rayo
 1983:  for Regocijo en el hombre
 1984: José Luis de Tomás for La otra orilla de la droga
 1985: Pau Faner Coll for Flor de sal
 1986: Manuel Vicent for Balada de Caín
 1987: Juan José Saer for La ocasión
 1988:  for Retratos de ambigú
 1989: Not awarded
 1990: Juan José Millás for La soledad era esto
 1991:  for Los otros días
 1992: Alejandro Gándara for Ciegas esperanzas
 1993: Rafael Argullol for La razón del mal
 1994: Rosa Regàs for Azul
 1995:  for Cruzar el Danubio
 1996:  for Matando dinosaurios con tirachinas
 1997:  for Quién
 1998: Lucía Etxebarria for Beatriz y los cuerpos celestes
 1999:  for Las historias de Marta y Fernando
 2000: Lorenzo Silva for El alquimista impaciente
 2001: Fernando Marías Amondo for El niño de los coroneles
 2002: Ángela Vallvey for Los estados carenciales
 2003: Andrés Trapiello for Los amigos del crimen perfecto
 2004: Antonio Soler for El camino de los ingleses
 2005: Pedro Zarraluki for Un encargo difícil
 2006: Eduardo Lago for Llámame Brooklyn
 2007: Felipe Benítez Reyes for Mercado de espejismos
 2008: Francisco Casavella for Lo que sé de los vampiros
 2009: Maruja Torres for Esperadme en el cielo
 2010: Clara Sanchez for Lo que esconde tu nombre 
 2011: Alicia Giménez Bartlett for Donde nadie te encuentre
 2012: Álvaro Pombo for El temblor del héroe
 2013: Sergio Vila-Sanjuán for Estaba en el aire 
 2014: Carmen Amoraga for La vida era eso
 2015: José C. Vales for Cabaret Biarritz
 2016:  for La víspera de casi todo
 2017: Care Santos for Media vida
 2018:  for Un amor
 2019: Guillermo Martínez for Los crímenes de Alicia
 2020: Ana Merino for El mapa de los afectos
 2021: Najat El Hachmi for El lunes nos querrán
 2022: Inés Martín Rodrigo for Las formas del querer
 2023: Manuel Vilas for Nosotros

Runners-up
List of runners-up (finalistas) of Premio Nadal since the award was instituted:

 1944: José María Álvarez Blázquez for En el pueblo hay caras nuevas
 1945: Francisco García Pavón for Cerca de Oviedo
 1946: Eulalia Galvarriato for Cinco sombras and Luis Manteiga for Un hombre à la deriva
 1947: Ana María Matute for Los Abel, Rosa María Cajal for Juan Risco and Juan Manuel Pombo Angulo for Hospital General
 1948: Manuel Mur Oti for Destino negro and Antonio Rodríguez Huescar for Vida con una diosa
 1949: Carlos de Santiago for El huerto de Pisadiel
 1950: Francisco Montero Galvache for El mar está solo
 1951: Tomás Salvador for Historias de Valcanillo, José María Jové for Mientras llueve en la tierra and José Antonio Giménez Arnau for De pantalón largo
 1952: Severiano Fernández Nicolás for La ciudad sin horizonte and Vicente Risco for La puerta de paja
 1953: Alejandro Núñez Alonso for La gota de mercurio
 1954: Ángel Oliver for Días turbulentos
 1955: Héctor Vázquez Azpiri for Víbora
 1956: Jesús López Pacheco for Central eléctrica
 1957: Lauro Olmo for Ayer, 27 de octubre
 1958: Claudio Bassols for El carnaval de los gigantes
 1959: Armando López Salinas for La mina
 1960: Gonzalo Torrente Malvido for Hombres varados
 1961: Pedro Antoñana for La cuerda rota
 1962: Manuel Barrios for El crimen
 1963: Mariano Viguera for Coral
 1964: Manuel Barrios for La espuela
 1965: Juan Farias for Los buscadores de agua
 1966: Carmelo M. Lozano for Gambito de alfil de rey
 1967: Francisco García Pavón for El reinado de Witiza
 1968: Eduardo García for Sede vacante
 1969: Luis Ricardo Alonso for El candidato
 1970: Gabriel García-Badell for De las Armas de Montemolín
 1971: Gustavo Álvarez de Gardeazábal for Dabeiba
 1972: Gabriel García-Badell for Las cartas cayeron boca abajo and Bernardo Víctor Carande for Suroeste
 1973: Gabriel García-Badell for Funeral por Francia y Aquilino Duque for El mono azul
 1974: Guillermo Ariel Ramón Carrizo for Crónica sin héroes
 1975: Manuel Villar Raso for Mar ligeramente Sur
 1976: Emilio Mansera Conde for La crisopa
 1977: Gabriel García-Badell for La zarabanda
 1978: Manuel Vicent for El anarquista coronado con adelfas and Rocío Vélez de Piedrahita for Terrateniente
 1979: Manuel Vicent for Ángeles o neófitos and Gabriel García-Badell for Nuevo auto de fe
 1980: Ramón Eiroa for Notas para la aclaración de un suicidio and Jorge González Aranguren for En otros parques donde estar ardiendo
 1981: Alfonso Zapater for El accidente and Juan Luis González Ripoll for El dandy del lunar
 1982: José Luis Aguirre for La excursión
 1983: José Avello Flórez for La subversión de Beti García
 1984: Telmo Herrera for Papá murió hoy
 1985: Vicente Sánchez Pinto for Los desiertos del amor
 1986: Horacio Vázquez-Rial for Historia del Triste and Rafael Humberto Moreno-Durán for Los felinos del Canciller
 1987: José Ferrater Mora for El juego de la verdad
 1988: Jesús Carazo for Los límites del paraíso
 1989: Not awarded
 1990: Pedro Crespo García for El cuaderno de Forster
 1991: Mariano Arias for El silencio de las palabras
 1992: Jesús Díaz for Las palabras perdidas
 1993: Jorge Ordaz for La perla del Oriente
 1994: José Ángel Mañas for Historias del Kronen
 1995: Félix Bayón for Adosados
 1996: Juana Salabert for Arde lo que será
 1997: Lorenzo Silva for La flaqueza del bolchevique
 1998: Ignacio García-Valiño for La caricia del escorpión
 1999: Lilian Neuman for Levantar ciudades
 2000: José Carlos Somoza for Dafne desvanecida
 2001: Lola Beccaria for La luna en Jorge
 2002: José Luis de Juan for Kaleidoscopio
 2003: David Torres for El gran silencio
 2004: Javier Puebla for Sonríe Delgado
 2005: Nicolás Casariego for Cazadores de luz
 2006: Marta Sanz for Susana y los viejos
 2007: Carmen Amoraga for Algo tan parecido al amor
 2008: Eva Díaz Pérez for El Club de la Memoria
 2009: Rubén Abella for El libro del amor esquivo
 2013: Esteban Navarro for La noche de los peones

References

External links
 Ediciones Destino

Spanish literary awards
Awards established in 1944
Planeta literary awards